is the third  season of the JoJo's Bizarre Adventure anime by David Production, based on the JoJo's Bizarre Adventure manga series by Hirohiko Araki. This season covers Part 4 of the manga, titled Diamond Is Unbreakable. Set in 1999, the season follows the adventures of Josuke Higashikata, the illegitimate son of Joseph Joestar, as he and his new friends hunt for an evasive magical bow and arrow which has granted people dangerous Stand powers, uprooting Josuke's previously quiet life in his home town of Morioh.

The anime adaptation of Diamond is Unbreakable was announced at the end of "The Last Crusaders" event for the JoJo's Bizarre Adventure: Stardust Crusaders anime in Tokyo on October 24, 2015; a teaser trailer was uploaded to Warner Bros. Japan's YouTube channel shortly after. The series was directed by Naokatsu Tsuda and Toshiyuki Kato, with the screenplay by Yasuko Kobayashi, character designs by Terumi Nishii, and the score composed once again by Yugo Kanno. Diamond Is Unbreakable aired in Japan between April 2, and December 24, 2016, and was simulcast by Crunchyroll. The opening theme for the first 14 episodes is "Crazy Noisy Bizarre Town" performed by The DU, (Jun Shirota, Daisuke Wada, and Jeity), the theme for episodes 15–26 is "Chase" performed by pop rock band Batta, and the theme for episode 27 onwards is "Great Days" by Daisuke Hasegawa and Karen Aoki. The ending theme is the 1996 single "I Want You" by Australian pop group Savage Garden. The ending theme for episode 39 is "Great Days Units ver." by JO☆UNITED (Hiroaki "Tommy" Tominaga, Coda, Jin Hashimoto, Jun Shirota, Daisuke Wada, Jeity, Tatsu Hoshino, Daisuke Hasegawa, and Karen Aoki). 

An original video animation (OVA) episode based on the Thus Spoke Kishibe Rohan spin-off manga was distributed in 2017 to those who purchased every DVD or Blu-ray release of the series. A second OVA was released with a special edition of the manga's second volume on July 19, 2018.

On July 6, 2018, Viz Media announced that the series would air on Adult Swim's Toonami; episodes began broadcasting on August 19, 2018.

Plot
Set around mid-1999 in Japan, Jotaro Kujo tracks down Josuke Higashikata, the illegitimate son of Joseph Joestar, to help him find a supernatural bow and arrow which grants people Stand powers. Along the way, Josuke and his friends discover that a Stand-using serial killer named Yoshikage Kira is on the loose in their hometown of Morioh, armed with an explosive Stand named Killer Queen. Josuke's group corners the murderer, but he escapes by changing his face to that of businessman Kosaku Kawajiri and assumes his identity. Though Kira gains a new ability named Bites the Dust that can create a time loop, Kosaku's son Hayato tricks him into revealing his identity, leading to his defeat by Josuke and his allies.

Voice cast

Episode list

Notes

References

External links
  
 

JoJo's Bizarre Adventure (Season 3)
2016 Japanese television seasons
Serial killers in television
Television series set in 1999